Buffalo Creek is a stream in the U.S. state of Iowa. It is a tributary to Clear Creek.

Buffalo Creek was so named on account of the buffalo (American bison) which once roamed the area.

References

Rivers of Johnson County, Iowa
Rivers of Iowa